"Let Love Be Your Energy" is a song by English singer Robbie Williams, released in April 2001 as the fourth single from his third studio album, Sing When You're Winning (2000). The song reached number 10 in the United Kingdom and entered the top 40 in several other countries. It was not released in Australia until 2002, when it peaked at number 53 on the ARIA Singles Chart. The music video for the single was presented in animation. It featured a cartoon facsimile of Williams always on the run in search of love. There is a second, raunchier version of the video depicting animated nudity and sex.

Track listings

UK and New Zealand CD single
 "Let Love Be Your Energy" – 4:57
 "My Way" (live) – 4:32
 "Rolling Stone" – 3:30
 "My Way" (live film)

UK cassette single
 "Let Love Be Your Energy" – 4:57
 "My Way" (live) – 4:32
 "Rolling Stone" – 3:30

European CD single
 "Let Love Be Your Energy" – 4:57
 "Rolling Stone" – 3:30

Australian CD single
 "Let Love Be Your Energy" – 4:57
 "Eternity" (full length) – 5:02
 "Toxic" – 3:48
 "Rolling Stone" – 3:43

Credits and personnel
Credits are taken from the Sing When You're Winning album booklet.

Studios
 Recorded at Master Rock Studios (North London, England) and Sarm Hook End (Reading, England)
 Mixed at Battery Studios (London, England)
 Mastered at Metropolis Mastering (London, England)

Personnel

 Robbie Williams – writing, lead vocals
 Guy Chambers – writing, reverse guitars, all keyboards, Moog solo, production, arrangement
 Dave Catlin-Birch – backing vocals
 Andy Caine – backing vocals
 Steve McEwan – backing vocals
 Gary Nuttall – backing vocals
 Claire Worrall – backing vocals
 Alana Duncan – child's voice

 Neil Taylor – electric guitar
 Phil Spalding – bass guitar
 Fil Eisler – reverse bass
 Chris Sharrock – drums
 Andy Duncan – drum and percussion programming
 Steve Sidwell – piccolo trumpet
 Steve Power – production, mixing
 Richard Flack – Pro Tools
 Tony Cousins – mastering

Charts

Release history

References

2000 songs
2001 singles
Chrysalis Records singles
Robbie Williams songs
Song recordings produced by Guy Chambers
Songs written by Guy Chambers
Songs written by Robbie Williams